The Foleshill Rural District was a former rural district in Warwickshire, England. The district covered the rural areas surrounding the village of Foleshill, which is now a suburb of Coventry.

The district was created in 1894 under the Local Government Act 1894. It lost territory in 1928, when Bedworth was established as a separate urban district, and it also lost the parishes of Stoke and Stoke Heath to the County Borough of Coventry. In 1932 the entire district was abolished and its territory divided between Bedworth, Coventry, the Meriden Rural District, the Rugby Rural District and the Warwick Rural District.

Parishes

At various times Foleshill RD consisted of the following civil parishes:

Ansty
Bedworth (until 1928)
Binley Woods
Exhall
Foleshill
Keresley
Shilton
Stoke & Stoke Heath (until 1928)
Walsgrave on Sowe
Willenhall
Withybrook
Wyken

References
Administrative unit Foleshill RD - VisionofBritain 
Place:Foleshill Rural, Warwickshire, England - www.werelate.org

History of Warwickshire
Local government in Warwickshire
Districts of England created by the Local Government Act 1894
Rural districts of England